Yacyretá Island (Spanish: Isla Yacyretá; Guaraní: jasý retã "land of the Moon") is an island in the Itapúa Department, Paraguay, located in the Paraná River, sectioned by the Yacyretá Dam. Administratively, it is part of the southern province of Itapúa.
Is known for its white sand dunes. It has a population of about 400 people live mainly from fishing.

See also 
 Yaciretá Dam
 Geography of Paraguay

References

River islands of Paraguay
Islands of the Paraná River
Misiones Department